Blades is a fictional London gentlemen's club appearing and referenced in several of Ian Fleming's James Bond novels, most notably Moonraker. Blades is situated on "Park Street" (correct name Park Place) off St James's Street, at the approximate location of the real-life club Pratt's.

Inspirations
Based on Fleming's notes as well as details of the club included in the novels, Blades is an amalgam of several nearby clubs, several of which Fleming mentions by name in various Bond books. These include:
Boodle's, where Fleming himself was a member and which has a lineage similar to that of Blades (both being descended from the earlier Savoir Vivre Club) as well as having similar architecture;
The Portland Club, which features bridge and where Fleming was a member, preferring the bridge games there because, as at Blades, they were played for high stakes;
White's, with which (like Blades), Beau Brummell, Horace Walpole, and Edward Gibbon had some association and where M's real-life counterpart, Sir Stewart Menzies, was a member, and where Fleming too was a member until moving to Boodle's; and
Brooks's, located quite close to Blades, founded at the same time, sharing its emphasis on gaming and its association with the Hellfire Club, and providing at least one of the famous bets to be found in Blades's betting book.

Fictional history
Blades was founded between 1774 and 1776 and is of a calibre equal to or greater than that of any other club. In fact, Fleming writes that when the club closes for the month of September each year, any of its members who are still in London typically pass the time at White's or Boodle's, disliking the clientele at each for different reasons. It excels in terms of member accommodations, staff, food, and furnishings, and its members include some of the finest card players in the world. The club membership is restricted to 200 at any given time, and there are only two qualifications for being elected a member: behaving like a gentleman and being able to prove a net worth of at least £100,000 (£ in  pounds) in cash or gilt-edged securities. M is a member of Blades, and James Bond, though not a member, is an occasional guest. M often lunches at Blades, usually eating a spare meal of grilled Dover sole and Stilton cheese, and always pays his bill with a five-pound note in order to receive newly minted notes and coins as change, a club tradition. As a favour to M, Blades also stocks a cheap Algerian red wine to which M is partial, but does not include it on the wine list; he calls it "Infuriator" and drinks it only in small quantities unless he is in a very bad mood.

Amenities offered by the club include:

 Overnight lodgings, in which guests' money is taken away and replaced with newly minted notes/coins each morning
 Freshly ironed newspapers in the reading room
 Soaps and lotions from Floris of London in all bedrooms and lavatories
 A direct line to Ladbrokes from the porter's lodge
 Reserved tents and boxes at horse race meetings and other sporting venues
 Automatic membership at the leading club in the capital of any foreign country visited by a member

Membership at Blades costs £100 for an initial entrance fee, and £50 in annual dues. Each member is required to win or lose at least £500 per year at the gaming tables or else pay a fine of £250. No bills are presented for any meals; at the end of each week, the total cost is prorated among the winners and deducted from their profits.

Blades plays a prominent role in the novel Moonraker. Both M and club chairman Basildon suspect another member, Sir Hugo Drax, of cheating at bridge. Because Drax is involved in a nuclear missile project crucial to national security, M and Basildon wish to avoid a scandal. Knowing of Bond's skill at cards and training in catching cheaters, M invites him to Blades to ascertain Drax's method. Bond discovers that Drax is using a highly polished silver cigarette case as a "shiner" − a mirror that allows him to see the cards as he deals − and devises a plan to discourage him from further cheating, with help from M and Basildon. During a very high-stakes bridge game, Bond switches in a cold deck in order to deal an extraordinarily good hand to Drax and thus increase his confidence. Not knowing that Bond has dealt himself a grand slam, Drax doubles and accepts an immediate redouble by Bond; Drax loses, costing him a total of £15,000 for the entire evening.

References

Bibliography
Ian Fleming,  Moonraker London: Penguin Books., 1955 .
Ian Fleming, You Only Live Twice (Glidrose, 1964).
Gary Giblin & Christopher Lee, James Bond's London (Daleon Enterprises Inc., 2001).
John Griswold, Ian Fleming's James Bond: Annotations and Chronologies for Ian Fleming's Bond Stories (AuthorHouse, 2006).
John Pearson, The Life of Ian Fleming (Jonathan Cape, 1966).
John Timbs, Club Life of London with Anecdotes of the Clubs, Coffee-Houses and Taverns of the Metropolis During the 17th, 18th, and 19th Centuries, vol. 1 (London: Richard Bentley, 1866).

James Bond organisations
Fictional clubs